"Only My Heart Talkin'" is a power ballad by singer Alice Cooper taken from his 1989 album Trash. It is one of four singles taken from the album (the other three being "Poison", "House of Fire" and "Bed of Nails").

The song was written by Alice Cooper, Bruce Roberts and Andy Goldmark. It features Steven Tyler on guest vocals.

The song only peaked at #89 on the US charts, but the song had bigger success in Australia, achieving #47 at its peak, though it was the second least successful single from the album, behind House Of Fire, which peaked at no. 80.

Chart positions

References

1990 singles
Songs written by Alice Cooper
Songs written by Andy Goldmark
Songs written by Bruce Roberts (singer)
Alice Cooper songs
Song recordings produced by Desmond Child
1989 songs
Epic Records singles
Glam metal ballads
Glam metal songs